La Tabatière Airport  is an airport at La Tabatière, Quebec, Canada.

Airlines and destinations

References

External links
La Tabatiere (airport info and photo)

Certified airports in Côte-Nord